The solar power plant Telangana I at Palwai village near Gadwal in the Mahbubnagar district of Telangana is a 12 megawatt (MWDC) photovoltaic power station, commissioned in June 2016. Telangana I operates under the SPV Talettutayi Solar Projects Private Limited and was constructed using 38,430 solar modules. The plant was developed by SolarArise India Projects Pvt Limited, which the shareholders are ThomasLloyd Group, the European Initiative on Clean, Renewable Energy, Energy Efficiency and Climate Change related to Development SICAV SIF in relation to Global Energy Efficiency and Renewable Energy Fund (“GEEREF”), advised by the European Investment Bank Group, Kotak Mahindra managed Core Infrastructure India Fund (“CIIF”) and the founding management team Anil Nayar, James Abraham and Tanya Singhal. Solar Arise currently owns and operates 130 MW of grid-connected solar power projects in India.

References

External links
 https://www.thomas-lloyd.com/en/portfolio-item/telangana-i/

Photovoltaic power stations in India
Mahbubnagar district
2016 establishments in Telangana
Solar power stations in Telangana